The Immaculate Conception Parish Church, also referred to as Shrine of the Immaculate Conception, Santuario de la Inmaculada Concepcion or Concepcion Church, is a late 19th-century, Baroque church located at Brgy. San Nicolas Poblacion, Concepcion, Tarlac, Philippines. The parish church, under the aegis of Our Lady of the Immaculate Conception, is under the jurisdiction of the Roman Catholic Diocese of Tarlac.

Parish Origin
History suggests two origins for the town of Concepcion. First, Concepcion was already an established parish separate from its matrix in Magalang, Pampanga on August 9, 1866. The second story is that it was created in 1860 from the following barrios of Magalang: Matondo, Maycanalo, San martin, Bucsit, San Juan and Garlit.

Architecture
The stone and brick convent was said to have been erected by Father Guillermo Masnou in 1880 while the present-day church was built by Father Fernando Vasquez in 1893. Its facade was described as being identical to that of the pre-war church of Tarlac. It is predominantly Neo-Romanesque in design with the presence of the recessed arch on the central part of the facade (marred by the concrete porte cochere). The facade is bare of ornamentation save for several circular and semi-circular arched windows. Two, three-tiered, bell towers rise on both sides of the facades.

References

External links

Roman Catholic churches in Tarlac
Roman Catholic churches completed in 1893
Spanish Colonial architecture in the Philippines
Baroque architecture in the Philippines
19th-century Roman Catholic church buildings in the Philippines